

References

 .
 .

Salvador, Bahia
Roman Catholic churches in Salvador, Bahia